Guo Chunliang is a Chinese Paralympic javelin thrower. He won the silver medal in the men's javelin throw F46 event at the 2016 Summer Paralympics in Rio de Janeiro, Brazil.

At the 2015 IPC Athletics World Championships held in Doha, Qatar he won the gold medal in the men's javelin throw F46 event.

At the 2017 World Para Athletics Championships held in London, United Kingdom he won the bronze medal in the men's javelin throw F46 event.

References

External links 
 

Living people
Year of birth missing (living people)
Place of birth missing (living people)
Chinese male javelin throwers
Athletes (track and field) at the 2016 Summer Paralympics
Medalists at the 2016 Summer Paralympics
Paralympic silver medalists for China
Paralympic medalists in athletics (track and field)
Paralympic athletes of China
21st-century Chinese people